Eulepidotis is a genus of moths of the family Erebidae erected by Jacob Hübner in 1823.

Species

 Eulepidotis addens (Walker, 1858)
 Eulepidotis affinis (Schaus, 1911)
 Eulepidotis aglae (Schaus, 1921)
 Eulepidotis alabastraria (Hubner, 1823)
 Eulepidotis albata (Felder & Rogenhofer, 1874)
 Eulepidotis albidus (Blanchard, 1852)
 Eulepidotis albistriata (Hampson, 1926)
 Eulepidotis anna (Dyar, 1914)
 Eulepidotis argentilinea (Schaus, 1906)
 Eulepidotis argyritis (Butler, 1879)
 Eulepidotis atalanta (Bar, 1876)
 Eulepidotis austrina (Schaus, 1911)
 Eulepidotis bipartita (Dognin, 1914)
 Eulepidotis bourgaulti (Bar, 1875)
 Eulepidotis caeruleilinea (Walker, 1858)
 Eulepidotis candida (Bar, 1876)
 Eulepidotis carcistola (Hampson, 1926)
 Eulepidotis caudatula (Herrich-Schaffer, 1854)
 Eulepidotis chloris (Bar, 1876)
 Eulepidotis columbrata (Dyar, 1915)
 Eulepidotis colleti Barbut & Lalanne-Cassou, 2011
 Eulepidotis corrina (Cramer, 1775)
 Eulepidotis croceipars (Dyar, 1914)
 Eulepidotis crocoptera (Felder & Rogenhofer, 1874)
 Eulepidotis crocota (Hampson, 1926)
 Eulepidotis deiliniaria (Hampson, 1926)
 Eulepidotis delecta (Schaus, 1911)
 Eulepidotis detracta (Walker, 1858)
 Eulepidotis dives (Butler, 1879)
 Eulepidotis dominicata (Guenee, 1852)
 Eulepidotis electa (Dyar, 1914)
 Eulepidotis emilia (Bar, 1875)
 Eulepidotis erina (Dyar, 1914)
 Eulepidotis ezra (Druce, 1898)
 Eulepidotis flavipex (Dognin, 1914)
 Eulepidotis folium (Schaus, 1911)
 Eulepidotis formosa (Bar, 1875)
 Eulepidotis fortissima (Dyar, 1914)
 Eulepidotis geminata (Packard, 1869)
 Eulepidotis graminea (Hampson, 1926)
 Eulepidotis guttata (Felder & Rogenhofer, 1874)
 Eulepidotis hebe (Moschler, 1890)
 Eulepidotis hemileuca (Guenee, 1852)
 Eulepidotis hemithea (Druce, 1889)
 Eulepidotis hermura (Schaus, 1898)
 Eulepidotis holoclera (Dyar, 1914)
 Eulepidotis ilyrias (Cramer, 1776)
 Eulepidotis inclyta (Fabricius, 1775)
 Eulepidotis juliata (Stoll, 1790)
 Eulepidotis juncida (Guenee, 1852)
 Eulepidotis junetta (Dyar, 1914)
 Eulepidotis magica Dyar, 1914)
 Eulepidotis merosticta (Hampson, 1926)
 Eulepidotis merricki (Holland, 1902)
 Eulepidotis mesomphala (Hampson, 1926)
 Eulepidotis metalligera (Butler, 1879)
 Eulepidotis metamorpha (Dyar, 1914)
 Eulepidotis micca (Druce, 1889)
 Eulepidotis microleuca (Dyar, 1914)
 Eulepidotis modestula (Herrich-Schaffer, 1869)
 Eulepidotis mustela (Druce, 1889)
 Eulepidotis nicaea (Druce, 1900)
 Eulepidotis norduca (Schaus, 1901)
 Eulepidotis ornata (Bar, 1876)
 Eulepidotis ornatoides (Poole, 1989)
 Eulepidotis osseata (Bar, 1875)
 Eulepidotis ouocco (Dyar, 1914)
 Eulepidotis panamensis (Hampson, 1926)
 Eulepidotis penumbra (Dyar, 1914)
 Eulepidotis perducens (Walker, 1858)
 Eulepidotis perlata (Guenee, 1852)
 Eulepidotis persimilis (Guenee, 1852)
 Eulepidotis philosis (Schaus, 1921)
 Eulepidotis phrygionia (Hampson, 1926)
 Eulepidotis preclara (Todd, 1962)
 Eulepidotis primulina (Druce, 1900)
 Eulepidotis prismatica (Dyar, 1914)
 Eulepidotis pulchella (Bar, 1876)
 Eulepidotis punctilinea (Schaus, 1921)
 Eulepidotis rectimargo (Guenee, 1852)
 Eulepidotis reducens (Dyar, 1914)
 Eulepidotis regalis (Butler, 1879)
 Eulepidotis reticulata (Bar, 1876)
 Eulepidotis sabina (Bar, 1875)
 Eulepidotis santarema (Walker, 1865)
 Eulepidotis santosina (Hampson, 1926)
 Eulepidotis schedoglauca (Dyar, 1914)
 Eulepidotis scita (Walker, 1869)
 Eulepidotis selecta (Dyar, 1914)
 Eulepidotis serpentifera (Brabant, 1909)
 Eulepidotis stella (Bar, 1875)
 Eulepidotis stigmastica (Dyar, 1914)
 Eulepidotis striaepuncta (Herrich-Schaffer, 1868)
 Eulepidotis striataria (Stoll, 1782)
 Eulepidotis superior (Guenee, 1852)
 Eulepidotis suppura (Dyar, 1914)
 Eulepidotis suzetta (Dyar, 1914)
 Eulepidotis sylpha (Dyar, 1914)
 Eulepidotis tabasconis (Hampson, 1926)
 Eulepidotis teligera (Brabant, 1910)
 Eulepidotis testaceiceps (Felder & Rogenhofer, 1874)
 Eulepidotis thermochroa (Hampson, 1926)
 Eulepidotis transcendens (Dyar, 1914)
 Eulepidotis umbrilinea (Dognin, 1914)
 Eulepidotis vicentiata (Stoll, 1790)
 Eulepidotis viridissima (Bar, 1876)
 Eulepidotis zebra (Barbut & Lalanne-Cassou, 2010)

Former species
 Dyomyx egista (Bar, 1876) (described as Eulepidotis egista)
 Dyomyx egistoides (Bar, 1876) (described as Eulepidotis egistoides)
 Eulepidotis reflexa (Herrich-Schaffer, 1869) is now a synonym of Lepidomys irrenosa

References
Barbut, J. & Lalanne-Cassou, B. (2011). "Description of a new species of Eulepidotis Hübner, 1823, discovered in the natural reserve of the Trinité (French Guiana) (Lepidoptera: Erebidae: Eulepidotinae)". Bulletin de la Société Entomologique de France. 116 (2): 181–184.
Lafontaine, J. D. & Schmidt, B. C. (2010). "Annotated check list of the Noctuoidea (Insecta, Lepidoptera) of North America north of Mexico". ZooKeys. 40: 1–239.

External links

 Eulepidotis
Eulepidotinae
Moth genera